Potawatomi Park is an unincorporated community in Tippecanoe Township, Kosciusko County, in the U.S. state of Indiana.

Geography

History
Named after the Potawatomi tribe that were native to this area.

References

Unincorporated communities in Kosciusko County, Indiana
Unincorporated communities in Indiana